The R703 road is a regional road in Ireland which runs west-east from Thomastown in County Kilkenny through Graiguenamanagh before crossing into County Carlow and terminating at the R702 in Ballymurphy, County Carlow.

See also
Roads in Ireland
National primary road
National secondary road

References
Roads Act 1993 (Classification of Regional Roads) Order 2006 – Department of Transport

Regional roads in the Republic of Ireland
Roads in County Kilkenny
Roads in County Carlow